Edward Emanuel Isbey  (3 August 1917 – 25 July 1995) was a New Zealand politician of the Labour Party.

Biography

Early life and career
Isbey was born in London in 1917, the son of Alec Isbey a tailor who immigrated from Lithuania. He received his education in London and gained a diploma in industrial management. During World War II, he served in the Merchant Navy. For 17 years he worked on a whale factory ship in the Antarctic Ocean. He emigrated to New Zealand in 1947.

Isbey was a clothing factory manager from 1948 to 1953, then went into dairy farming in Mercer and later Hokianga, before working on the waterfront (1954–1969). In 1955 he stood successfully for election to the executive of the Auckland Watersiders Union and in 1956 he was elected vice-president before being elected president several months later after the sudden resignation of Bill Hooker. He was then elected the president of the New Zealand Watersiders Union, retaining the role for 11 years from 1959 to 1970 in conjunction with being the Auckland president for 12 years from 1956 to 1967. As president he led the Auckland Watersiders to affiliate with the Labour Party. In 1963 the union voted with a two-to-one majority to formally affiliate via a postal ballot. He was a close friend and associate of leading unionists such as Tom Skinner and Jim Knox.

He was also the vice-president of New Zealand Rugby League and an administrator of several theatres in Auckland including the board of the Mercury Theatre and the Auckland Theatre Trust. He was also the chairman of the special committee of the New Zealand Shipping Corporation.

Political career

He joined the Labour Party upon arriving in New Zealand (his parents having been active members of the Labour Party in London) and served as a delegate to the Auckland Labour Representation Committee and later the Auckland Labour Regional Council.

He was successful and resigned his trade union roles after entering parliament. Initially he found it hard to transition from a union spokesperson to a parliamentary backbencher. In the lead up to the  Labour leader Norman Kirk sent Isbey to Tokoroa to pacify striking timber workers and prevent the issue interfering with the election.

After Labour won the 1972 election, Isbey put himself forward for a seat in the cabinet of the Third Labour Government. In the ensuing caucus ballot he polled reasonably well, but after nine other Auckland MPs were elected to cabinet the subsequent voting reflected a concern for regional representation and neither Isbey or any other Aucklander was elected for the remaining positions. However he was appointed as a Parliamentary Under-Secretary to the Minister of Labour, Minister of Civil Aviation & Meteorological Services and Minister of Transport from 1973 to 1974 by Norman Kirk. When Bill Rowling became Prime Minister he appointed Isbey Under-Secretary to the Minister of Railways.

In 1973 he was elected vice-president of the Labour Party, after withdrawing from the ballot for president in favour of Charles Bennett. His win was something of a surprise with Stan Rodger, President of the Public Service Association, seen as the front-runner. Other aspirants were Ron Barclay, Roger Drayton, Jonathan Hunt, Gerald O'Brien and Trevor Young (all MPs). As vice-president he pledged himself to bring about greater unity between the industrial and political wings of the Labour movement.

When Labour was in opposition (1975–84) Isbey was shadow minister for Labour, Immigration, the Arts and Sport and Recreation. He was one of the earliest proponents of nuclear-free legislation. He introduced a bill to make New Zealand nuclear-free in 1976 but it was voted down by the Muldoon Government. Later, in 1982 Isbey received a public anti-nuclear petition when it was presented to parliament.

In 1977, Isbey received the Queen Elizabeth II Silver Jubilee Medal.

In 1978 his seat of Grey Lynn was abolished, absorbed mostly into , in an electoral redistribution. In danger of his political career being ended by a redistribution, he was given the unflattering nickname Eddie 'Was-bey'. He stood against Labour's incumbent Auckland Central MP, Richard Prebble, for the nomination but was beaten by Prebble. He then set his sights on unrelated seats after allegedly being promised "we will find you a safe seat Eddie" by the party hierarchy. Isbey put himself forward for the seat of  before withdrawing at the last moment on a tip he would win the  nomination. However he was defeated in an upset by Ralph Maxwell.

During the Fourth Labour Government he was appointed as a Parliamentary Under-Secretary to the Minister of Labour, Minister of Employment and Minister of Immigration by David Lange. He was replaced in the Papatoetoe electorate by Ross Robertson.

Later life and death
In the 1988 New Year Honours, Isbey was appointed a Companion of the Queen's Service Order for public services. In 1990, he was awarded the New Zealand 1990 Commemoration Medal.

Isbey died in Auckland on 25 July 1995 aged 77.

Personal life
On 9 June 1953, he married Annette Constance Graham, the daughter of Walter (Mick) Graham. They had two sons and one daughter. He met Annette (who was an artist) while attending an art exhibition in Auckland. His pastimes included theatre, boats, reading, art, watching football, and boxing. In 1978, he lived in Herne Bay, Auckland.

His brother Dave Isbey (1915–1994) was likewise a unionist and Labour politician. He crewed a whaling ship to Antarctica in 1939 before joining Merchant Navy (like his brother) during World War II. After the war he came to New Zealand and got job with the Auckland Harbour Board. He was president of the Auckland Labour Representation Committee and stood twice for the Auckland City Council in 1959 and 1962, but was unsuccessful.

Notes

References

1917 births
1995 deaths
New Zealand Labour Party MPs
New Zealand trade unionists
Companions of the Queen's Service Order
New Zealand MPs for Auckland electorates
Members of the New Zealand House of Representatives
20th-century New Zealand politicians
Politicians from London
English emigrants to New Zealand
British Merchant Navy personnel of World War II